Amin "Mimi" Darwish (20 March 1942 – 11 December 2011) was an Egyptian footballer. He competed for Egypt at the 1964 Summer Olympics.

See also
 Football at the 1964 Summer Olympics

References

External links
Profile at Footballdatabase.eu

1942 births
2011 deaths
Egyptian footballers
Egypt international footballers
Olympic footballers of Egypt
Footballers at the 1964 Summer Olympics
People from Ismailia Governorate
Ismaily SC players
Egyptian Premier League players
Association football defenders